Jessica Faieta is the Assistant Administrator and Director of the Regional Bureau for Latin America and the Caribbean, United Nations Development Programme (UNDP). Prior to this appointment of 7 May 2014 by United Nations Secretary-General Ban Ki-moon, Ms. Faieta served as the UNDP Deputy Regional Director of the Bureau for Latin America and the Caribbean. 
    
Ms. Faieta has many years of distinguished service within UNDP, holding various leadership positions. Before working for the UNDP Regional Bureau for Latin America and the Caribbean, Ms. Faieta served as Senior Country Director at the UNDP Bureau in Haiti. There, she led UNDP's post-disaster recovery effort after the 2010 earthquake. She also held the positions of United Nations Resident Co-ordinator and UNDP Resident Representative in the UNDP offices in El Salvador and Belize, as well as Deputy Director and Deputy Chief of Staff in the Office of the UNDP Administrator.   

From 2005 to 2007, Ms. Faieta served in the Executive Office of the United Nations Secretary-General where she held the positions of Principal Officer to the Chef de Cabinet and Director of the Office of the Deputy Secretary-General. Earlier in her career, she worked in a variety of positions, both at UNDP Headquarters and in United Nations field offices in Argentina, Panama, Cuba, Belize and Guyana.  She began her career at the Canadian Embassy in Ecuador as a Commercial Officer.

Ms. Faieta holds a Master of International Affairs, Economic Development and a Master of Business Administration in International Finance from Columbia University, New York, and a Bachelor of Science in Economics from State University of New York, New Paltz.

Ms. Faieta succeeds Heraldo Muñoz of Chile

References

Ecuadorian officials of the United Nations
Living people
Year of birth missing (living people)
Columbia Business School alumni
School of International and Public Affairs, Columbia University alumni
State University of New York at New Paltz alumni